Saint-Trojan is a commune in the Gironde department in Nouvelle-Aquitaine in southwestern France. It is in the Blaye wine region of Bordeaux, with the Château Mercier and Vignobles Briolais vineyards located in the village.

The United States Navy established a naval air station on 14 July 1918 to operate seaplanes during World War I. The base closed shortly after the First Armistice at Compiègne.

Population

See also
Communes of the Gironde department

References

Communes of Gironde